Rob Townsend (born 7 July 1947) is an English rock and blues drummer. He was the drummer for progressive rock band Family and later The Blues Band.

Biography
Townsend was born in Frog Island, Leicester, England, where he spent his teenage years playing in various bands, such as the Beatniks, Broodly Hoo and Legay. He became drummer for Family, replacing Harry Overnall in 1967. Family broke up in 1973 and Townsend joined Medicine Head. After eighteen months he left Medicine Head and spent much of the late 1970s as freelance session drummer for Peter Skellern, George Melly and Bill Wyman amongst others. During this time he played drums for Kevin Ayers and Charlie Whitney's Axis Point.

In 1982 Townsend joined The Blues Band, in a line up including Paul Jones, guitarists Dave Kelly and Tom McGuinness also bassist Gary Fletcher. He has also appeared with Jones and McGuinness in the Manfred Mann splinter band The Manfreds.

Townsend once said in an interview:

Townsend mentioned jazz greats Buddy Rich and Gene Krupa as influences in the same interview.

Notes

Further reading
Rob Townsend interview with Mark Forster
Rawlings, Terry. Then, now and rare British beat 1960-1969. Omnibus press (2002). 
Buckley, Peter. The rough guide to rock. Rough Guides (2003). 
Larkin, Colin. The Guinness Encyclopedia of Popular Music. Guinness (1992). Item notes ver 2. Digitized (19 June 2007). 
Strong, Martin Charles and Peel, John. The Great Rock Discography. Canongate US (2004). 7th edition.

External links
Strange Band: The Family Home Page

Family (band) members
1947 births
Living people
English rock drummers
People from Leicester
Musicians from Leicestershire
The Manfreds members
The Blues Band members